Vasily Ivanovich Chapayev or Chapaev (5 September 1919) was a Russian soldier and Red Army commander during the Russian Civil War.

Biography
Chapayev was born into a poor peasant family in a village called Budayka, now part of Cheboksary. During World War I, he fought as a non-commissioned officer and was awarded the Cross of St. George three times. In September 1917, he joined the Russian Social Democratic Labour Party (Bolsheviks). In December he was elected commander of the 138 Infantry Regiment by a vote of the regiment's soldiers. He later commanded the 2nd Nikolaev Division and the 25th Rifle Division.

On 5 September 1919, the divisional headquarters near Lbishchensk (renamed Chapayev in his honour) were ambushed by White Army forces. According to official sources, Chapayev tried to escape by swimming across the Ural River, but was never again seen alive. "In 1919, a wounded Chapayev was shot and drowned in the Ural river". His body was never recovered. In 1926, the newspapers Pravda, Izvestia and Krasnaya Zvezda reported on the arrest of the former Cossack officer Trofimov-Mirsky, who allegedly shot Chapaev after capturing him during a raid on Lbishensk. Chapaev's daughter Claudia and his great-granddaughter Evgenia wrote about the betrayal of the commander and the organization of his death by Leon Trotsky, as well as about the participation in the conspiracy of Pelageya Kameshkertseva. None of the "non-canonical" versions received documentary evidence.

Private life
In 1908 Chapayev became acquainted with Pelageya Metelina, who was 18. Although his father didn't approve of their relations, Vasily Ivanovich married her. They lived together for 6 years, and had three children, one of whom was Klavdia Chapayeva. Though there was no official divorce, in 1917 Chapayev started living with the widow of his deceased fellow-soldier Petr Kishkertsev. Curiously enough, her name was also Pelageya. Chapayev adopted both of her children. Currently the only relative that remains is his great-great-granddaughter Vasilisa Chapayeva, with her parents Yevgenia Chapayeva and Viktor Pecherin.

Legacy

Memorial museums of Chapaev were opened in Cheboksary near the place of his birth; in the city of Pugachev (former Nikolaevsk), with a branch in the city of Balakovo, where he spent his childhood and youth. Museums have also been opened in the buildings where the headquarters of the 25th Infantry Division was located during the Civil War: in the village of Krasny Yar in the Ufimsky district of the Republic of Bashkortostan, in the town of Belebey of the Republic of Bashkortostan, in the city of Uralsk and in the village of Lbischenskaya (now the town of Chapaev) at the site of the last battle division chief. In the Soviet years, museums dedicated to Chapaev and the combat path of the 25th division existed in many schools.

Dozens of settlements in the Samara (Chapayevsk), Saratov, Orenburg regions and other regions of Russia are named after Chapaev, Lbishensk in modern Kazakhstan was also renamed in his honor during the Soviet era, Chapaev streets exist in hundreds of settlements on the territory of the former USSR, the Chapaevka River was named after him. In 1937, the Kiev cinema "Lira" on Bolshaya Zhitomirskaya Street, 40 was renamed the "Chapaev cinema".

Monuments to Chapaev were erected in the cities of Samara (1932), in St. Petersburg (1933), in Pugachev (1957), in Cheboksary (1960) (earlier since the 1930s it was located on the territory of VDNKh in Moscow), in the village of Chapaev - a stele at the site of the alleged death and a monument on the central square (1979), in Uralsk (1982), as well as in dozens of other cities and towns of the former Soviet Union. In 1973, for the museum in Uralsk, Efim Deshalyt painted the diorama "The Last Battle of Chapaev", in 1976 for the museum in Chapaev - the diorama "Fight of the Chapaevs in the village of Lbischenskaya" by artists Veniamin Sibirsky and Evgeny Danilevsky.

In Russian culture

After the Soviet Union had been established, Chapayev was immortalized by Soviet propaganda as a hero of the Russian Civil War. In 1923, a Russian writer, Dmitriy Furmanov, who served as a commissar in Chapayev's division wrote a popular novel entitled Chapaev. Later, in 1934, it was made into a film Chapayev by the Vasilyev brothers. The movie became highly popular in the Soviet Union. The German actor and singer Ernst Busch also recorded the song Tschapajews Tod, which talks about his death in the Ural.

More recently, he became one of the central characters in the novel Chapayev and Void by modern Russian writer Viktor Pelevin.

In November 1998, Red Comrades Save the Galaxy, a point-and-click graphic adventure game was developed by S.K.I.F. and published by Buka Entertainment (now 1C Company). The game's protagonist Vasily Ivanovich Chapaev, is inspired by Chapayev.

Chapayev, along with his aide Petka, became a recurring character in popular Russian jokes.

See also
Chapayev, a board game named after Chapayev
Red Comrades Save the Galaxy, a point-and-click graphic adventure game which features a main character inspired by Chapayev
Chapayevsk
, a group of cruisers built for the Soviet Navy
Chapaev Battalion
Chapaev Peak, a mountain in Kyrgyzstan named after Chapayev

Bibliography

References

External links

Chapaev the novel a detailed summary at SovLit.net
 Василий Иванович Чапаев: Biography in Russian.
 "ГУЛЯЛ ПО УРАЛУ ЧАПАЕВ-ГЕРОЙ..."

1887 births
1919 deaths
People from Cheboksary
People from Cheboksarsky Uyezd
Russian Social Democratic Labour Party members
Old Bolsheviks
Russian communists
Russian military personnel of World War I
Soviet military personnel of the Russian Civil War
Recipients of the Cross of St. George
Recipients of the Order of the Red Banner